Adrienne Francis (born 1978) is an Australian journalist, broadcaster and presenter on ABC.

Early life
Francis grew up in Sydney and spent considerable time in Jindabyne in the Snowy Mountains of New South Wales. Adrienne attended the University of Sydney reading agricultural science before launching her career in media.

Career
Francis has worked for the ABC since 2003 in TV and Radio News. At ABC Canberra since 2010, Adrienne presents the ABC's flagship TV and Radio News bulletins in the ACT and writes for their digital news service. Adrienne has worked as a television current affairs reporter for 7.30 ACT, which was one of Canberra's most popular TV programs. Francis was previously posted with the ABC in the Northern Territory of Australia.

References

1978 births
ABC News (Australia) presenters
Journalists from Sydney
Living people
Australian women television journalists